Bandit-warfare Badge (Bandenkampfabzeichen) was a World War II decoration of Nazi Germany awarded to members of the Army, Luftwaffe, Order Police, and Waffen-SS for participating in Nazi security warfare (Bandenbekämpfung). The  badge was instituted on 30 January 1944 by Adolf Hitler after authorization/recommendation by Heinrich Himmler.

Background
Especially on the Eastern Front, the terms "partisan" and "bandit" were applied by the Nazi security apparatus to Jews, communists, Soviet state officials, Red Army stragglers, and any other persons deemed to pose a security risk. Rear-area security operations against armed irregular fighters ("pacification actions") were often indistinguishable from massacres of civilians, accompanied by burning down villages, destroying crops, stealing livestock, deporting able-bodied population for slave labour to Germany and leaving parent-less children on their own.

Description 
All versions of the badge feature a skull and crossed bones at the base, with a laurel wreath of oak leaves around the sides and a sword in the center. The sword's handle has the "sun-wheel" swastika, with the blade plunged into a Hydra whose five heads represent the "partisans". The second version of the badge had larger oak leaves in the wreath and a larger "sun-wheel" swastika. Historian Philip W. Blood notes the similarities between the symbol of the occultist Thule Society, with a sword and a swastika, and the design of the badge. He suggests that Himmler and Erich von dem Bach-Zalewski "had sealed [...] Germanic mythology into a medal for Lebensraum". 

The badge existed in three grades:
Bronze, for 20 combat days against "bandits"
Silver, for 50 combat days against "bandits"
Gold, for 150 combat days against "bandits" 
Criteria were slightly different for the Luftwaffe, being based on 30, 75, and 150 operational flights/sorties flown in support of "bandit-fighting" operations.

Citations

Sources
 
 

Orders, decorations, and medals of Nazi Germany
Awards established in 1944
1944 establishments in Germany
Bandenbekämpfung